Aslambek Akhmedovich Aslakhanov (Асламбек Ахметович Аслаханов, born 11 March 1942 in Novye Atagi) is the State Duma deputy from Chechnya, advisor and former aide to Russian president Vladimir Putin.

He is a retired General of the MVD.

External links 
 Aslakhanov's bio from the Russian Presidential Executive Office.

1942 births
Living people
People from Shalinsky District, Chechen Republic
Chechen people
Members of the Supreme Soviet of Russia
Third convocation members of the State Duma (Russian Federation)
Advisers to the President of Russia
Russian lieutenant generals
Russian police officers
Chechen politicians
People of the Chechen wars
Beslan school siege
Moscow theater hostage crisis
Recipients of the Order of Honour (Russia)
Members of the Federation Council of Russia (after 2000)